Térraba is an indigenous territory in Costa Rica of the Naso people.

References 

Indigenous territories of Costa Rica